Ove Vilmer Lundell (May 29, 1930 - September 4, 2001) was a Swedish professional motocross racer. He competed in the Motocross World Championships from 1958 to 1965. Lundell was one of the top off-road motorcyclists of his era coming from Sweden, a nation that produced many of the sport's first world champions.

Motorcycling career
Lundell was born in Möklinta outside Sala in the county of Västmanland, Sweden. His career began at the age of fifteen, when he performed at Swedish circuses where he rode Wall of Death carnival sideshows on an old Indian motorcycle.

Lundell worked during the 1950s and 1960s as a rider for the Monark factory racing team. Monark was a large Swedish bicycle and motorcycle manufacturer that was also involved in construction and development. Lundell won the Swedish motocross national championship in 1955, 1958 and 1960, and was a member of victorious Swedish Motocross des Nations teams in 1958, 1961 and 1962. Lundell won his first and only motocross world championship race on June 30, 1963 at the 500cc Russian Grand Prix.

Lundell was also successful in a variety other events, such as road racing, enduro, and Snowmobile races. Lundell won several Gold Medals in the International Six Days Trial and won the Swedish enduro national championship riding Monark motorcycles.

During the late 1960s and early 1970s, Lundell was a highly regarded coach for young Swedish motorcycle riders, based at Anneberg Motocross Track outside Varberg on the Swedish west coast. From the mid-1970s to the early 1980s he worked in Manaus, Brazil helping develop a Monark moped for that country. He returned to Sweden and in 1984, he started racing again, taking part in many National and International vintage racing events with great success. He died of cancer in Varberg in the county of Halland, Sweden.

References

External links
Ove Lundell: Who Was He?

People from Sala Municipality
People from Varberg
Swedish motocross riders
1930 births
2001 deaths
Enduro riders
Motorcycle trials riders
Deaths from cancer in Sweden
Sportspeople from Västmanland County